The Lancun−Yantai railway or Lanyan railway is a double-track, electrified railway in Shandong Province, China. It was built from 1953 to 1956 and double-tracked in 2001.

The Qingdao–Rongcheng intercity railway runs approximately parallel to this line for most of its route.

References

See also

List of railways in China
Rail transport in the People's Republic of China

Railway lines in China
Rail transport in Shandong